Lucas Ariel Ocampos (born 11 July 1994) is an Argentine professional footballer who plays as a winger for La Liga club Sevilla and the Argentina national team.

Ocampos began his senior career in Argentina with River Plate before joining Monaco for a Ligue 2 record fee of €11 million in 2012. He spent two-and-a-half seasons in the principality and was nominated for the European Golden Boy award before joining Marseille. There, he spent four seasons, either side of loan spells in Italy with Genoa and Milan, before joining Sevilla in 2019.

Club career

Early career
Ocampos started playing football at the academy of Quilmes at the age of six where he first played as a striker. It was with Quilmes that Ocampos was spotted by River Plate. In a youth match against the Buenos Aires-based club Ocampos scored twice, prompting the management at River to follow his progression. They completed his signing after the U15 Sudamericano in which Ocampos excelled for Argentina, signing him on a 50% co-ownership deal with Quilmes.

River Plate

Ocampos' first opportunity with River Plate's senior side came in 2011 following the club's relegation to the Nacional B for the first time in their history. He was awarded his first-team debut by manager Matías Almeyda on 16 August 2011, aged 17, against Chacarita Juniors and scored his first goal for the club in the following match, netting River's opener in a 3–1 win over Independiente Rivadavia. Ocampos and Almeyda's paths had previously crossed at Quilmes where Almeyda had been a player at the time of the Ocampos' arrival at the academy. Ocampos soon established himself as a regular in the starting eleven and was instrumental in River securing the club's promotion back to the Primera División, ending the season with 7 goals to his name in 38 appearances. His form throughout the season had also seen him named by FIFA as one of the Players to Watch in 2012. He made his Primera División debut on the opening day of the following season against Belgrano. It would be his final appearance for the club, however, as on 6 August 2012 he completed a transfer to French club Monaco.

Monaco

On 6 August 2012, Ligue 2 side AS Monaco, owned by Russian billionaire Dmitry Rybolovlev and managed by Claudio Ranieri, completed the signing of Ocampos for a reported fee of €11 million, with the fee split between Quilmes, River and a group of investors. The completion of the deal saw Ocampos become the most expensive Ligue 2 signing of all-time. He made his debut for the club on 31 August 2012, coming on as a second-half substitute for Emir Bajrami in a 2–1 loss against Le Havre. Ocampos then scored his first goal for the club in his second appearance in the third round of the Coupe de la Ligue as Monaco beat Valenciennes 4–2. The goal, a spectacular bicycle kick in extra-time, was later chosen by Monaco supporters as the club's Goal of the Season. His first league goal for the club came on 18 January 2013 when he scored one and recorded an assist for Gary Kagelmacher in a 2–0 win over Istres. Ocampos ultimately featured in 29 appearances across the league campaign, scoring four goals as Monaco secured their return to Ligue 1.

Monaco's promotion to Ligue 1 was accompanied by a spate of free-spending by Rybolovlev. The Russian owner completed the big-money signings of James Rodríguez, Radamel Falcao and João Moutinho, amongst others, with the effect that Ocampos found his influence within the Monaco squad diminishing. Despite featuring more from the bench than from the start, Ocampos still managed a return of 5 goals in 34 appearances as Monaco ended the season as runners-up to mega-money rivals PSG. Monaco's failure to secure the league title despite heavy investment saw Ranieri sacked at the end of the season and replaced by Leonardo Jardim. Despite seeing his game time reduced further under Jardim, Ocampos was nominated for the European Golden Boy award in October 2014, though the award was eventually won by Liverpool's Raheem Sterling. On 26 November, Ocampos scored his first Champions League goal in a 1–0 away win against Bayer Leverkusen. Having started only seven matches by the end of January 2015, Ocampos requested a move away from the principality and was granted his wish with a transfer to Ligue 1 rivals Marseille.

Marseille
On 3 February 2015, Ocampos signed for Monaco's Ligue 1 rivals Marseille on loan until the end of the season, where he paired up with compatriot and manager, Marcelo Bielsa. He made a goal scoring debut for the club four days later, netting in a 1–1 draw with Rennes. He ultimately made fourteen appearances and scored twice during his loan spell as Marseille ended the season in fourth. On 30 June 2015, Marseille announced that Ocampos had signed for the club on a permanent deal for a fee believed to be around €7 million. He scored his first goal of the season in a 6–0 victory over Troyes on 23 August. The goal, another bicycle kick from a Romain Alessandrini cross, was later nominated for the Ligue 1 Goal of the Season award, which was ultimately won by Pierrick Capelle of Angers It was his only contribution in front of goal, however, as after the resignation of Bielsa early in the campaign Ocampos struggled to impress under new manager Míchel, and made only 17 appearances throughout the league season.

Loans to Genoa and Milan
On 29 June 2016, Serie A side Genoa announced the signing of Ocampos on a season-long loan, with an option to purchase included. He made his debut for the club on 12 August, coming on as a second-half substitute in a 3–2 Coppa Italia win over Lecce, and made his Serie A debut on 21 August in a 3–1 win over newly promoted Cagliari. In September, Ocampos injured ligaments in his knee which saw him ruled him out of action for a month. He made his return on 6 November and scored his first goal for Genoa in a 1–1 draw with Udinese. He scored his second goal the following week in a 3–1 loss to Lazio before scoring his third and final goal for the club on 22 January 2017, netting Genoa's second in a 2–2 draw with Crotone. Towards the end of January, Genoa and Marseille reached an agreement to allow Ocampos to join fellow Serie A side A.C. Milan for the remainder of his loan spell for a reported fee of €500k.

On 30 January 2017, Milan confirmed the loan signing of Ocampos for the remainder of the season, with Genoa retaining the option to buy from Marseille at the end of the loan spell. He was signed as a replacement for Frenchman M'Baye Niang who had moved on loan to Premier League side Watford. Ocampos made his debut for the club on 5 February, coming on as a late second-half substitute for Andrea Bertolacci in a 1–0 defeat to Sampdoria. He featured sporadically for the club, however, and at the end of the season returned to Marseille having played a combined 29 matches and scored 3 goals across all competitions during his stints with Genoa and Milan.

Return to Marseille

Ocampos scored on his first Ligue 1 appearance following his return to Marseille, netting the only goal in a 1–0 win over Nantes on 12 August 2017. On 1 October, he scored a brace in the game against Nice winning the game for Marseille with 4–2. He maintained his form throughout the first half of the season, scoring 6 goals in 15 league appearances by the end of the year, which saw him linked with a move to Torino during the January transfer market. He remained at Marseille, however, and on 7 February 2018 he scored his first professional hat-trick in a 9–0 Coupe de France win over Bourg-en-Bresse. The result was also Marseille's biggest win 70 years. He also featured regularly in the club's Europa League campaign and helped the side reach the final of the competition, where they lost 3–0 to Spanish side, Atlético Madrid. He remained with Marseille the following season before departing for Spain, having scored 28 goals in 135 appearances during his time with the club.

Sevilla
On 3 July 2019, Ocampos signed a five-year contract with La Liga side Sevilla for an undisclosed fee. On 11 August 2020, he scored the winning goal for Sevilla in the 88th minute, in a 1–0 win against Wolverhampton Wanderers in the 2019–20 UEFA Europa League quarter-finals. In his debut season with Sevilla, Ocampos scored 14 goals in La Liga to finish 4th in the table, and eventually won the Europa League. On 24 September 2020, he scored from a penalty in 1–2 defeat against Bayern Munich in the 2020 UEFA Super Cup.

Loan to Ajax
On 31 August 2022, Ocampos signed for Ajax on a season-long loan with a buy option included worth €16m. Ocampos was signed as a direct replacement for Antony, who had just joined Manchester United for a record Eredivisie fee of €100m. On 17 January 2023, Ajax announced that they had terminated the loan agreement with immediate effect after Ocampos had only played 114 minutes for the club.

International career
Having previously represented his nation at youth level, Ocampos made his senior Argentina debut on 9 October 2019 during a friendly against Germany, coming on as a half-time substitute for Ángel Correa and scoring a late equalizer in a 2–2 draw.

Career statistics

Club

International

Scores and results list Argentina's goal tally first, score column indicates score after each Ocampos goal.

Honours
River Plate
Primera B Nacional: 2011–12

Monaco
Ligue 2: 2012–13

Marseille
UEFA Europa League runner-up: 2017–18

Sevilla
UEFA Europa League: 2019–20
UEFA Super Cup runner-up: 2020
Individual
UEFA Europa League Squad of the Season: 2019–20

References

External links

 Profile at the Sevilla FC website
 
 

1994 births
Living people
People from Quilmes
Association football wingers
Argentine footballers
Argentina youth international footballers
Argentina international footballers
Argentine expatriate footballers
Argentine Primera División players
Primera Nacional players
Ligue 1 players
Ligue 2 players
Serie A players
La Liga players
Eredivisie players
Club Atlético River Plate footballers
AS Monaco FC players
Olympique de Marseille players
Genoa C.F.C. players
A.C. Milan players
Sevilla FC players
AFC Ajax players
Expatriate footballers in Monaco
Expatriate footballers in Italy
Expatriate footballers in Spain
Expatriate footballers in the Netherlands
UEFA Europa League winning players
Sportspeople from Buenos Aires Province